Gulberg Town  (Sindhi and ) lies in the northern  part of the city. Gulberg Town was formed in 2001 as part of The Local Government Ordinance 2001, and was subdivided into 11 union councils. The town system was disbanded in 2011, and Gulberg Town was re-organized as part of Karachi Central District in 2015 and the Karachi Towns were restored in early 2022.

Location 
Gulberg Town was bordered by the Lyari River and Gulshan Town to the east and the Gujjar Nala stream and North Nazimabad Town to the west. Also neighbouring Gulberg were New Karachi and Gadap to the north and Liaquatabad to the south.

History 
The federal government introduced local government reforms in the year 2000, which eliminated the previous "third tier of government" (administrative divisions) and replaced it with the fourth tier (districts). The effect in Karachi was the dissolution of the former Karachi Division in 2001, and the merging of its five districts to form a new Karachi City-District with eighteen autonomous constituent towns including Gulberg Town. In 2011, the system was disbanded but remained in place for bureaucratic administration until 2015, when the Karachi Metropolitan Corporation system was reintroduced. In 2015, Gulberg Town was re-organized as part of Karachi Central district.

Education and academia 
Apart from the socio-economic diversification, this town had the distinction of being one of the most literate middle/upper middle class parts of the city along with North Nazimabad Town. There were numerous coaching centres in Gulberg Town, among them C.A.M.P. Collegiate is one of the famous coaching centre which is located in Block 10, Federal.B.Area.

"Markaz-e-Umeed" (The Hope Center) is one of the oldest schools for intellectually disabled children in Pakistan, established in 1971.

Hospitals 
 Tabba Heart Institute 
 Habib Medical Center
 Aga Khan Hospital for Women Karimabad (Ayesha Manzil)
 Usman Memorial Hospital
 Mamji Hospital
 Aziza Husseni Hospital
 Karachi Institute of Heart Diseases
 Federal Hospital
 Alnoor Hospital
 Muhammadi Hospital
 Rafah-e-aam Medical
 Nazeer hussain Hospital
 Mother care Hospital

Neighbourhoods 
 Samanabad
 Aisha Manzil
 Ancholi
 Alnoor Society
 Azizabad
 Karimabad
 Shafiq Mill Colony
 Naseerabad
 Water Pump
 Yaseenabad
 Musa Colony
 Dastagir Colony
 Hussainabad

References

External links 
 Districts of Karachi

 
Karachi Central District
Towns in Karachi